Little Pine Creek is a tributary of Pine Creek in Lycoming County, Pennsylvania, in the United States.

Course
Little Pine Creek begins at the confluence of Texas Creek and Blockhouse Creek in Pine Township. It flows roughly southwest, parallel to Pennsylvania Route 284 and receives the tributaries Bear Run, Bonell Run, and Lick Run. The creek then passes through English Center. Further downstream, it receives the tributaries Coal Run, Callahans Run, and Otter Run. The creek then enters Cummings Township, where it passes through a dam known as the Little Pine Dam. On the southern side of the dam, it turns south and meanders several miles until it crosses Pennsylvania Route 44 and reaches its confluence with Pine Creek.

Geography and watershed

Little Pine Creek is said to resemble a smaller version of Pine Creek. The velocity of its waters is also faster than those of Pine Creek. The creek's valley is narrow and resembles a canyon in its lower reaches. Groves of sycamore and summer camps are found along the valley.

Recreation
The difficulty rating of the creek is between A and 2-. The scenery along it is described as "good" by Edward Gertler in his book Keystone Canoeing.

Little Pine Creek flows through Little Pine Creek State Park for part of its length.

See also
List of rivers of Pennsylvania

References

External links

U.S. Geological Survey: PA stream gaging stations
Little Pine State Park official website
Pine Creek Gorge official website

Rivers of Pennsylvania
Tributaries of Pine Creek (Pennsylvania)
Rivers of Lycoming County, Pennsylvania